Sara Hagemann is a Danish academic and an expert on international and European politics. She has published extensively on issues related to political processes and representation in the European Union, transparency in politics, and the role of national parliaments in international affairs. Sara is currently Professor of Political Science and Vice Dean at the Faculty of Social Sciences, Copenhagen University, where she joined in September 2021. Before then she was associate professor at the London School of Economics and Associate Dean at the LSE School of Public Policy and a faculty member of the LSE European Institute. Sara has also held positions as head of programme and policy analyst at the European Policy Centre's Political Europe Programme and the Centre for European Policy Studies in Brussels, senior fellow at the UK in a Changing Europe, and worked in the Danish Ministry for Foreign Affairs.

Early life and education 
Hagemann was born in 1979 in Aarhus, Denmark, to former Secretary General of the Nordic Council Henrik Hagemann and school teacher Jytte Fisker. She undertook her postgraduate studies at the Department of Government of the London School of Economics where she was awarded her PhD in 2007 with a thesis entitled 'Decision-Making in the European Union’s Council of Ministers’ under the supervision of Simon Hix.

Works

References

Living people
Danish political scientists
Academics of the London School of Economics
European Union and European integration scholars
Year of birth missing (living people)
Women political scientists